The Type 91 was an aerial torpedo of the Imperial Japanese Navy. It was in service from 1931 to 1945.  It was used in naval battles in World War II and was specially developed for attacks on ships in shallow harbours.

The Type 91 aerial torpedo had two unique characteristics. Firstly, it used wooden stabilizers attached to the tail fins which were shed upon water entry. Secondly, it engaged an angular acceleration control system to control rolling movements, which was very advanced for its time.

Since the Type 91 torpedo was the only practical aerial torpedo of the Imperial Japanese Navy, it was simply known as the Koku Gyorai, or aerial torpedo. Surface warships and submarines used other types of torpedoes, namely the Type 93 and Type 95 respectively, while the Type 97 torpedo was designed for use by midget submarines.

Specifications
A slight variant was used to sink HMS Prince of Wales and HMS Repulse, launched from Mitsubishi G4M "Betty" bombers in an action in the South China Sea three days after Pearl Harbor on 10 December 1941.

Variants
Below is the list of the series of Type91 aerial torpedo production models.

The Type 91 (modification 2), was a shallow-water aerial torpedo that was designed for and used in the attack on Pearl Harbor in 1941. Wooden fins and a softwood breakaway nose cone were added to allow for launching into shallow water at low altitudes.

There were two versions in the Type 91 warhead rev.3, differing in designed maximum launch speeds.

Later, heavier models had a decreased range.

Other Japanese aerial torpedoes 
In spring 1944, the Yokosuka air arsenal began development of the Shisei Gyorai M (trial model torpedo M), or simply the Two tonne torpedo. It would have been the largest aerial torpedo in the Imperial Japanese Navy Air Force, but the operating concept became outdated and the project was never completed. However, the Type91 aerial torpedo project members did not regard it as a part of the Type91 series.

Type 91 history 

 Chronological Table
 1931Type 91 aerial torpedo is put into service, production begins.
 1936Revision 1. Self-detachable wooden plates are introduced.
 1939Revision 2 starts production. Not running true after water entry is identified as a major problem.
 1941Revision 2 clears the  shallow water launching test due to the introduction of an anti-rolling controller. Battle of Pearl Harbor, sinking of HMS Prince of Wales and HMS Repulse.
 1941Revision 3 starts production.
 1942 Indian Ocean raid, Battle of the Coral Sea, Battle of Midway, Battle of the Santa Cruz Islands. 2 August: Type 91 torpedo technology reaches Nazi Germany via IJN sub I-30
 1943Revision 5 starts production.
 1944Battle of the Philippine Sea, Aerial Battle of Taiwan-Okinawa.

Initial development 
Rear Admiral Seiji Naruse led the team in charge of the initial development of the Type91 aerial torpedo at the Yokosuka Naval Arsenal. The team was known as the Ninety One Association and included Lt Cmdr Haruo Hirota, Lt Cmdr Makoto Kodaira (Matsunawa), Naval Assistant Manager Iyeta, Naval Engineer Noma, Naval Engineer Moritoshi Maeda, Lieutenant Hidehiko Ichikawa, and Teruyuki Kawada, a university student who was a naval apprentice.

Captain Fumio Aiko was in charge of further development of the torpedo from 1931. Captain Aiko managed the team as it developed an effective aerial torpedo and anti-rolling controller. He considered the Type91 aerial torpedo to be his great achievement.

Delayed development
At the beginning of 1934, Kan-Pon or the Imperial Japanese Navy Technical Department, an operating division of the Ministry of the Navy of the Imperial Japanese government, which had the primary responsibility for naval weapon systems, had their own plan for a Japanese aerial torpedo. In their concept, a big flying boat was to carry a variant of the heavy Type93 oxygen torpedoes to launch at long range, and then turn back towards safety. This eventually proved to be an unrealistic desk plan. Kan-Pon confidentially developed their own Type94 torpedo and even ordered a halt to production of the Type 91. This significantly delayed the development schedule of the Type91 and frustrated the project members.

Wooden tail stabilizers added 
The project team developed Kyoban wooden aerodynamic stabilizer plates for the Type91's tail fins as revision1 in 1936. These stabilized the torpedo in flight to ensure the proper angle for water entry and were designed to shear off on entry to the water,  preventing the torpedo from diving too deep. The team demonstrated their effectiveness in tests at altitudes of both  the following year.

The original Type91 was considered to have a frail body, and so this was strengthened in a new model in 1938 known as revision2.

Anti-rolling controller developed 
Type 91 aerial torpedoes won admiration for their effective anti-rolling controller and acceleration control system. Before the anti-rolling controller was introduced, the early versions of the Type91 had serious problems, as did all other aerial torpedoes of the time. When released at high speed, it had a tendency to make a double-roll in the air. When released into heavy seas, a spin could be imparted by the hard impact on water entry. Other issues included: the running direction veering on water impact; not running horizontally after water entry, but continuing vertically to either stick in the bottom of shallow water or be crushed by the water pressure (at a depth of 100m or so); jumping back out of the water; skipping along the water surface; or even running backwards. Only very experienced aviators could be sure of a clean torpedo bombing run, and then only when operating over a calm sea. A tumbling torpedo will run out of control once it hits the water. The gyrocompass and the depth meter may work well, but the torpedo cannot control the running direction by tail rudders unless they are initially in the neutral position. Once the torpedo rolls, the horizontal and vertical rudders lose their positions, resulting in a runaway.

The engineers and scientists of the Type 91 project concluded that any aerial torpedo needed an anti-rolling system with not only a damping stabilizer function but also an acceleration controlling function. Without these features any torpedo would be highly likely to fall into an unstable state. The idea of acceleration-control, or counter-steering, was at the time widely considered to be impossible.

A breakthrough on aerial torpedo design was made with the anti-rolling controller invented first by Iyeda, assistant manager of the arsenal workmen, in spring 1941. Ten days later, while the Iyeda system was being tested, Naval Engineer Noma invented another system. It functioned in a similar way, but with a different mechanism. During the prototype tests, Noma's system was found to be the better, having less time lag in its responses. So the Noma system was adopted for the next production version of Type91 and it went into final testing in August 1941, making practical the use of aerial torpedoes both in rough seas and in shallow waters. It enabled the Type91rev.2 to run under water no deeper than 20 meters, with experienced pilots learning to launch their torpedo so as to sink to a depth of no more than 10 meters.

Increase in explosive weight 
The anti-rolling controller also made it possible for the Type91 to carry a heavier warhead.

Main components (Type 91.rev.2)

Warhead 
Length = 

When a torpedo hits a ship, the inertia forces the initiator to thrust forward and ignite its high explosive. The high explosive in the warhead will not detonate unless initiated as designed. An aerial torpedo, released at an altitude of 100m, is falling at nearly Mach0.5 on water entry and receives over 100G at the hard impact on the water surface. The Type91 warhead had five reinforced bands on the front-bottom of the inner shell, lap welded in the shape of cut lower half star, or the superposition of the letterT and the letterΛ.

Air chamber 
L = 

The air chamber is a thin-shelled cylinder made of nickel-chromium-molybdenum steel. This tough steel alloy was originally developed for the steel armor plate of battleships. Its pressure drops to around  while running .

Front float 
L = 

The front float section has a pure water tank, a fuel oil tank and a depth meter. The depth meter is placed at the bottom of the section to detect the water depth. It detects the displacement level and controls the horizontal tail rudders' (or elevators)' accordingly, so that the torpedo maintains level running under water. The horizontal tail rudder controller is operated by the rod connection mechanism from the depth meter in the front float section. The horizontal tail rudders are locked at their uppermost position while the torpedo falls to the water surface.

Engine housing 
L = 

This section is exposed to incoming water to help cool the engine. It has a starter, a Chowaki or pressure regulator, a wet-heat chamber and a main engine. The starter starts controllers, one for vertical tail rudders, and another for roll rudders for anti-rolling in both side wing rudders.

The pressure regulator is called a Chowaki or harmonizing system. It is a two-stage pressure regulator with twin pressure-tunable regulation valves.

The wet-heat chamber is made of heat-resistant steel. Type91 aerial torpedoes use a wet-heater engine like almost all other torpedoes in World War II. The general wet heater burning method drastically improved the combustion efficiency of torpedo engines. It burns a mixed gas of fuel oil and the high-pressure air with a spray of pure water in the wet-heat block to produce burning steam gas which is fed to the engine. The sprayed pure water mists into the combustion gas, which produces a vapour explosion, resulting in completely gasified fuel oil combustion.

The main engine is an 8-cylinder single-row radial piston engine. A single drive shaft runs to the tail and the screws. The main engine is started when the torpedo hits the water. A thick safety bolt is inserted into the starter when the weapon is loaded on an aircraft. The bolt is pulled out from the torpedo when it is released and remains underneath the fuselage of aircraft.

Rear float 
L = 

This rear float section has a machine oil tank, a rudder controller, an anti-rolling controller, and roll rudders on both sides. The machine oil tank is centre-mounted in the rear float section. The rudder controller is a general gyrocompass controlled system, which steers the vertical rudders to keep the longitudinal axis of the torpedo in the sensed direction straight. Both the vertical rudder controller and the anti-rolling controller had their own gyroscope, which start rotating when the torpedo is released from an aircraft. Each gyro has dual ring support mechanisms to allow them to move freely.

Anti-rolling controller 

The anti-rolling controller is a gyro-controlled air valve system which steers the roll rudders (or ailerons) on both sides of a torpedo and is composed of a gyroscope, a main controller, and an output booster.

A spinning gyroscope senses the roll angle of the torpedo, and the controller then centers the roll by steering roll-rudders on both sides at an angle in the range of ±22.5°. The main controller controls two output air valves to steer and countersteer the roll rudders, according to the roll angle and its rate of change. It countersteers to correct the angle and its time derivative. The output booster or auxiliary valve has two inlets and two outlet ports. The output booster works as a pair of air shutoff valves. It is connected in cascade to the two output ports of the main controller. It switches on and off directly the two powerful high-pressure controlling air flows, one for clockwise twist and the other for counter-clockwise twist of the roll rudders. This is largely to ensure proper operation in heavy impact conditions.

Tail section 
L =  (to the tip end of propelling screw hub)

Bevel gears drive coaxial contra-rotating double 4-bladed screws to propel the torpedo under the water and keep it running straight. The tail section has vertical and horizontal stabilizer fins in a cross. Each fin has a controlling rudder in aft. Horizontal fins and rudders have a wide span in a longitudinal direction and work proportionally, while vertical fins are small, and rudders have a very short span.

Screws 
The propeller screws were coaxial contra-rotating double screws, with 4 propeller blades each. Each screw was wrought from a cubical mass of SK chromium-molybdenum alloy steel into a bold cross shape and punched through the centre. Hammering punches of 1tons and 3tons shaped the 4 blades. The propeller sections were compactly designed to allow the front screw and the rear screw to be only 5 mm apart.

Kyoban stabilizer plates 

The Type91's tail fins were fitted with Kyoban wooden aerodynamic stabilizer plates.  Introduced in 1936 these stabilized the torpedo in flight and helped to ensure the proper angle for water entry. The plates were designed to shear off on water entry, absorbing energy and preventing the torpedo from diving too deep. The aerodynamic wooden plates stabilized the torpedo in both the vertical and horizontal axes and provided drag to ensure the torpedo struck the water at or near the proper water entry angle despite the inevitable variations in drop altitudes and air speeds encountered in combat.  The structure was simple and worked well, as seen at Pearl Harbor, which was generally considered too shallow for aerial torpedoes prior to the attack.  The Kyoban was so effective the US Navy copied it for their Mark13 torpedo after observing it in action at the Battle of the Coral Sea. 

Two versions of the Kyoban stabilizer were used: A box-shaped version for single-engine carrier-based torpedo-bombers Nakajima B5N and Nakajima B6N and a cross-shaped version For twin-engine land-based torpedo-bombers G3M, G4M, P1Y, and Ki-67.  The cross-shaped version used longer plates to lower drag resistance but needed more clearance under the fuselage. In the case of land-based torpedo-bomber aircraft, a plate was set inside the bomb bay to smooth the airflow, otherwise the vortex coming in the bomb bay would disturb the torpedo at release.

Steering mechanism
There are three separate steering systems:
 The full steering system: The vertical rudder system steers the torpedo left or right by switching the rudders to one of full-right, neutral or full-left in response to signals from the gyroscope. This system responds relatively slowly to deviations from the correct running direction.
 The proportional steering system: The horizontal rudder system changes the angle of the rudders to cause the torpedo to run at a deeper or shallower depth in response to signals from the depth meter. This system has a moderately rapid response to deviations from the appropriate running depth.
 The angular velocity steering system: The two roll-rudders switch to one of full-up, neutral or full-down in response to signals from the anti-rolling controller. When the controller detects the torpedo returning to the centre position, the system counter-steers the roll rudders in opposite directions. This system has a rapid response to deviations in running direction.
The three systems operate simultaneously to maintain the appropriate direction, depth and attitude of the torpedo while running.

Production sites
The Type 91 was researched and developed at Yokosuka Naval Arsenal in Kanagawa Prefecture. It was first produced at the Mitsubishi-Urakami Ordnance Works division of Mitsubishi Heavy Industries. Later, the Imperial Japanese Navy established two manufacturing sites: Suzuka Naval Arsenal in Mie Prefecture; and Kawatana Naval Arsenal, a branch of Sasebo Naval Arsenal, in Nagasaki Prefecture. The Mitsubishi-Urakami Ordnance Works plant at Kawatana specialized in torpedo production and was destroyed by the atomic bomb dropped on Nagasaki.

Technology transfer to Germany
Germany approached Japan requesting the transfer of Japanese aerial torpedo technology. The Imperial Japanese Navy not only sent the plans, but also a number of Type91 aerial torpedoes to Germany in response. They arrived in Nazi hands on August2, 1942, courtesy of Japanese submarine I-30 as part of a yanagi mission. It was designated the Lufttorpedo LT 850 in German service.

Germany wished to acquire the knowledge behind the Imperial Japanese Navy Air Service's aerial torpedo technology in order to more effectively attack the Allied transport ships steaming in the Mediterranean Sea. It had previously imported Italian-made aerial torpedoes, which became unavailable following the Italian Armistice of Cassibile with the Allies in September 1943. The indigenous German aerial torpedo designs were badly restricted in launch speed and launch altitude.

Post-war commemoration
Some 30 years after the war, surviving members of the development team raised money to privately publish a small book, Koku Gyorai Note or Aerial Torpedo Notebook.

Type 91 torpedoes are currently displayed at the Etajima school of Japan Maritime Self-Defense (the Maritime Self Defense Force 1stTechnical School) and Shimofusa Base. They are missing the roll rudders. An excavated Type 91aerial torpedo is preserved at the Resource Museum in JGSDF Camp Naha, 1st Combined Brigade of The Western Army, JGSDF, located in Naha city, Okinawa. It retains the original features. It was picked up as unexploded ordnance by a bomb-disposal unit of the JGSDF. A captured Type91 aerial torpedo is displayed at the US Naval Academy, Annapolis, Maryland. It rests on two supports flanking a pathway in a small park in front of the Academy's Dahlgren Hall. Displayed on the other side of the pathway is a Type93 Japanese Long Lance ship-launched torpedo.

References

General references
  Privately printed book.
  Photographic print copies of Imperial Japanese Navy Action Reports.
  Prof. Ozawa is the designer of Ki-69.
  Seko was one of the last torpedo bombardiers of B6Ns.
 
 (August 1945), Resources from Torpedo bombing section, Kawatana branch, Naval aerial technology arsenal, Imperial Japanese Navy.
 (August 1945), Resources from the 1st torpedo section, Kawatana naval arsenal production firm, Imperial Japanese Navy.

External links 
 A page with many statistics on Japanese WWII torpedoes.

Torpedoes of Japan
World War II weapons of Japan
World War II naval weapons
Aerial torpedoes